Grégory Havret (born 25 November 1976) is a French professional golfer.

Career
Havret won the French Amateur Championship three years in a row from 1997 to 1999, and in 1999 he won the European Amateur. He also won a minor professional tournament as an amateur, the 1998 Omnium National.

Havret turned professional in 1999 and won a place on the European Tour at the 2000 Qualifying School. He finished 60th on the Order of Merit in 2001, his rookie season, recording a maiden tour victory at the Italian Open. Havret's biggest win to date came in the 2007 Barclays Scottish Open at Loch Lomond, where he overcame major winner Phil Mickelson in a playoff. In August 2008, Havret recorded a second tournament victory in Scotland (third overall), leading the Johnnie Walker Championship at Gleneagles at the end of every round in recording a one shot win over Graeme Storm.

Havret's best year-end ranking on the Order of Merit is 19th in 2007. In 2008 Havret reached the top 100 of the Official World Golf Ranking and established himself as the highest ranked French golfer.

As a qualifier and ranked 391 in the world, Havret was the runner-up at the 2010 U.S. Open, finishing one stroke behind Graeme McDowell.

Amateur wins
1997 (1) French Amateur Championship
1998 (1) French Amateur Championship
1999 (2) French Amateur Championship, European Amateur Championship

Professional wins (5)

European Tour wins (3)

European Tour playoff record (1–2)

French Tour wins (1)

Other wins (1)
1998 Omnium National (France, as an amateur)

Results in major championships

CUT = missed the half-way cut
"T" = tied

Summary

Most consecutive cuts made – 2 (twice)
Longest streak of top-10s – 1

Results in World Golf Championships

"T" = Tied
Note that the HSBC Champions did not become a WGC event until 2009.

Team appearances
Amateur
European Youths' Team Championship (representing France): 1996
 European Amateur Team Championship (representing France ): 1997, 1999
Eisenhower Trophy (representing France): 1998

Professional
Seve Trophy (representing Continental Europe): 2007
World Cup (representing France): 2007, 2008

See also
2019 European Tour Qualifying School graduates

References

External links

French male golfers
European Tour golfers
Mediterranean Games medalists in golf
Mediterranean Games gold medalists for France
Mediterranean Games silver medalists for France
Competitors at the 1997 Mediterranean Games
Sportspeople from La Rochelle
Sportspeople from Aix-en-Provence
1976 births
Living people
20th-century French people